The Wahpeton Post Office in Wahpeton, North Dakota, United States, is a post office building that was built in 1914.  It was listed on the National Register of Historic Places in 1989 as U.S. Post Office-Wahpeton.

References

Government buildings completed in 1914
Post office buildings on the National Register of Historic Places in North Dakota
National Register of Historic Places in Richland County, North Dakota
Neoclassical architecture in North Dakota
1914 establishments in North Dakota
Post Office